Joseph Grange (February 7, 1940 – July 20, 2014) was an American philosopher and Professor of Philosophy at the University of Southern Maine. He was president of the Metaphysical Society of America (2007–2008).

Books
 John Dewey, Confucius, and Global Philosophy (Suny Series in Chinese Philosophy and Culture), SUNY
 The City: An Urban Cosmology and Nature: An Environmental Cosmology, SUNY
 Nature: An Environmental Cosmology
 Metaphysics and Culture
 Soul: A Spiritual Cosmology
 Being and Dialectic: Metaphysics as a Cultural Presence, coeditor (with William Desmond), SUNY

References

External links
 Joseph Grange (February 7, 1940–July 20, 2014)

1940 births
2014 deaths
20th-century American philosophers
Philosophers of art
American philosophy academics
Fordham University alumni
Presidents of the Metaphysical Society of America
University of Southern Maine faculty